Nicolas De Corsi (1882 -1956)  was an Italian painter.  He was born in Odessa but lived in Torre del Greco for many years.

References

19th-century Italian painters
Italian male painters
20th-century Italian painters
20th-century Italian male artists
1882 births
1956 deaths
People from Torre del Greco
Artists from Odesa
Emigrants from the Russian Empire to Italy
19th-century Italian male artists